A Luggin capillary (also Luggin probe, Luggin tip, or Luggin-Haber capillary) is a small tube that is used in electrochemistry. The capillary defines a clear sensing point for the reference electrode near the working electrode. This is in contrast to the poorly defined, large reference electrode.

References

External links
Advanced Electrochemistry. Slide 15: Luggin capillary for reference electrode.

Electrodes
Electrochemistry